Electrical computer may refer to one of the following:
 Electrical analog computer
 Electrical digital computer